Leptobrachium boringii, commonly known as the Emei moustache toad or Taosze spiny toad, is a species of amphibian in the family Megophryidae. It is endemic to China where it is found in Sichuan, Guizhou, and Hunan provinces. "Emei" or "Taosze" in its common names refer to its type locality, Taosze on Mount Emei, Sichuan. Its natural habitats are temperate forests, grassland, arable land, and rural gardens near rivers. It is threatened by habitat loss.

Reproductive behaviour and strategies
Leptobrachium boringii exhibits sexual selection in a striking way. Male Leptobrachium boringii exhibit conspicuous keratinized nuptial spines that grow on their upper lip during the breeding season—these are the "moustache" and "spines" referred to in its common names. Moreover, male Leptobrachium boringii are larger, on average  in snout-vent length, than females, which are on average  in SVL (female-biased sexual size dimorphism is more common in frogs). These unusual features seem to relate to male–male combat for best breeding territories and/or female preference for larger males. However, also multiple paternity could be observed, suggesting that some males use the sneaker strategy to fertilize eggs, instead of defending territories.

References

boringii
Amphibians of China
Endemic fauna of China
Taxonomy articles created by Polbot
Amphibians described in 1945
Endangered Fauna of China